Teresa Daly (born February 22, 1956 in Minneapolis, Minnesota) is an American politician. She is a city councilwoman, and former candidate for the U.S. House of Representatives.

She graduated from Bloomington Jefferson High School and Macalester College, and then went on to receive her Master's Degree in Industrial Relations from the University of Minnesota. For 12 years, she served as Senior Vice President for Right Management Consultants. She is currently the President of the Association of Career Professionals International.

In 2002, she was elected to the Burnsville, Minnesota City Council, and in 2004, she was the DFL candidate for the United States House of Representatives for Minnesota's 2nd congressional district, as a challenger against Republican incumbent John Kline. She lost the election by 57% to 40% (with 3% for independent Doug Williams), a smaller-than-average margin for challengers to House incumbents in the 2004 election, although a slightly larger margin than that by which the same 2nd district voters voted for President Bush over John Kerry. After the election, she announced her intention not to run for Congress again and abandoned her campaign website.

Electoral history
2004 Race for U.S. House of Representatives - 2nd District
John Kline (R) (inc.), 56%
Teresa Daly (DFL), 40%

References
Teresa Daly profile provided by CNN

1956 births
Minnesota Democrats
Living people
Politicians from Minneapolis
Minnesota city council members
Carlson School of Management alumni
People from Burnsville, Minnesota
Women city councillors in Minnesota
21st-century American women